The Zimbabwe national cricket team toured New Zealand in December 2000 and January 2001 and played one Test match against the New Zealand national cricket team followed by three Limited Overs Internationals (LOI). The single test was drawn. New Zealand were captained by Stephen Fleming and Zimbabwe by Heath Streak. Zimbabwe won the LOI series 2–1.

Test series summary

One Day Internationals (ODIs)

Zimbabwe won the series 2–1.

1st ODI

2nd ODI

3rd ODI

References

2000 in New Zealand cricket
2000 in Zimbabwean cricket
2001 in New Zealand cricket
2001 in Zimbabwean cricket
International cricket competitions in 2000–01
New Zealand cricket seasons from 2000–01
2000-01